Tasuj ( - Tasūj) is a city in East Azerbaijan Province, Iran.

Tasuj may also refer to:
 Tasuj, Fars (Persian:  - Ţasūj)
 Tasuj, Kohgiluyeh and Boyer-Ahmad (Persian:  - Ţasūj)
 Tasuj District, in East Azerbaijan Province
 Tasuj Rural District (disambiguation)